The Laughing Whitefish River (not to be confused with the Whitefish River) is a  stream located on the Upper Peninsula of the U.S. state of Michigan. The river rises in eastern Marquette County and flows east and then north through Alger County to its mouth on Lake Superior at  a few miles north of Deerton, Michigan.

A notable attraction near Sundell is the Laughing Whitefish Falls State Park.

The access site to the river is named after John Hammar who was the handyman for George Shiras III, who (Shiras) is credited with the development of flash photography, and was widely acclaimed at the St.Louis World Fair in 1904, and won the gold medal.

Jurist John D. Voelker, a justice of the Michigan Supreme Court, published the novel Laughing Whitefish in 1965 under his pen name, Robert Traver.

References

Rivers of Michigan
Tributaries of Lake Superior
Rivers of Alger County, Michigan